Santosh Pandey is an Indian politician and a member of the Samajwadi Party from the state of Uttar Pradesh. Pandey is a member of the Sixteenth Legislative Assembly of Uttar Pradesh representing the Lambhua Vidhan Sabha constituency. His father is Ram Chandra Pandey and his mother is Sumitra Pandey.

References

Posts held

External links 
Uttar Pradesh Legislative Assembly

Members of the Uttar Pradesh Legislative Assembly
Living people
Samajwadi Party politicians
India MPs 2019–present
1975 births